or  is a lake in the municipality of Hamarøy in Nordland county, Norway. The lake Šluŋkkajávri lies just to the east of the lake. The water from Rekvatnet is piped downhill to a hydroelectric power station on the shores of the nearby lake Fjerdvatnet.

See also
List of lakes in Norway

References

Hamarøy
Lakes of Nordland